Uri Levine (born February 1965) is an Israeli entrepreneur and author He co-founded Waze, a traffic and navigation app, acquired by Google in June 2013 for more than $1.1 billion. He was the first board member and investor in Moovit, which was acquired by Intel for about US$1 billion in May 2020 Levine is also the author of 'Fall in Love with the Problem, Not the Solution- A handbook for Entrepreneurs', to be published on January 17, 2023.

Business career
Levine worked at Comverse (1989–2000), Joined Celltrex (2000–2002), and led the marketing and product at Openwave in 2002–2004. Between the years 2004–2007 he helped several startups as a consultant, including Mobixell and Perfecto. In 2007 he co-founded Waze with Ehud Shabtai and Amir Shinar. He was CEO (2008–2009) and later president of the company. Levine left Waze in 2013, after it was sold to Google, to build new startups. Since then, he has founded and invested in several startups, among them Pontera (previously FeeX), FairFly, Refundit, Seetree, and Fibo. He was a board member at Moovit and HERE., and also serves as an independent board member at Infosys.

References 

1965 births
Israeli Jews
Living people
People from Tel Aviv
People from Ramat HaSharon
Tel Aviv University alumni
Levine, Uri